Springfield High School may refer to:

Springfield High School (Colorado), Springfield, Colorado
Springfield High School (Illinois), Springfield, Illinois
Springfield High School (Louisiana), Springfield, Louisiana
Springfield High School of Science and Technology, Springfield, Massachusetts
Springfield High School (Minnesota), Springfield, Minnesota
Springfield High School (Holland, Ohio)
Springfield High School (Lakemore, Ohio)
Springfield High School (New Middletown, Ohio)
Springfield High School (Springfield, Ohio)
Springfield High School (Oregon), Springfield, Oregon
Springfield High School (Pennsylvania), Springfield, Pennsylvania
Springfield High School (Tennessee), Springfield, Tennessee
Springfield High School (South Carolina), Springfield, South Carolina
Springfield High School (Vermont), Springfield, Vermont
Springfield High School (Winnipeg), Winnipeg, Manitoba

Springfield High School may also refer to:

Cherry Valley-Springfield Junior/Senior High School, Cherry Valley, New York
Springfield Catholic High School (Missouri), Springfield, Missouri
Springfield Central High School, Springfield, Massachusetts
Springfield-Clark County Vocational School, Springfield, Ohio
Springfield Gardens High School, Springfield Gardens, New York
Springfield Southeast High School, Springfield, Illinois
Springfield Township High School, Erdenheim, Pennsylvania
West Springfield High School (Virginia), West Springfield CDP, Virginia
West Springfield High School (Massachusetts), West Springfield, Massachusetts

See also
Springfield School (disambiguation)
Springfield (disambiguation)